James Dudley Houston (November 10, 1933 – April 16, 2009) was an American novelist, poet and editor. He wrote nine novels and a number of non-fiction works (some co-authored and/or edited).

Early life
Houston was born in San Francisco, where his parents had migrated from Quanah, Texas, a small town named for the noted last Comanche war chief, Quanah Parker. The story behind the town's name kindled Houston's interest in treks and history. He graduated from Lowell High School. He did college studies at San José State University and Stanford University. At San José State, Houston met Jeanne Wakatsuki, his future wife. Her family had immigrated to California from Japan.

Literary career
Houston co-authored his wife's autobiographical memoir, Farewell to Manzanar, about her family's experiences in the Manzanar internment camp during World War II. The book became a bestseller after it was published in 1973.

Houston was the winner of two American Book Awards, a Joseph Henry Jackson Award for Fiction and the Humanitas Prize.

Houston's historical novel Snow Mountain Passage (2001) was inspired by a personal link to the ill-fated Donner Party of early Californian history. A second historical novel, Bird of Another Heaven (2007), explores California's beginnings, based on the history of Nani Keala, daughter of a Native American mother and Native Hawaiian father. She was one of a small group who went up the Sacramento River with John Sutter in 1839 and helped build the eponymous fort.

Works
 Between Battles (1968)
 Gig (1969)
 A Native Son of the Golden West, Ballantine Books (1972)
 Farewell to Manzanar, with Jeanne Wakatsuki Houston (1972)
 An Occurrence At Norman's Burger Castle (1972) 
 The adventures of Charlie Bates (1973)
 Three Songs for My Father (1974)
 Continental Drift (1978)
 California Heartland: Writing from the Great Central Valley, with Gerald W. Haslam (1978)
 West Coast Fiction: Modern Writing from California, Oregon, and Washington, editor (1979)
 Gasoline: The automotive adventures of Charlie Bates (1980)
 Californians: Searching for the Golden State (1982)
 One Can Think About Life After the Fish Is in the Canoe: And Other Coastal Sketches/Beyond Manzanar: Views of Asian-American Womanhood, with Jeanne Wakatsuki Houston (1985)
 Love Life (1985)
 The Men in My Life: And Other More or Less True Recollections of Kinship (1987)
 Surfing : the sport of Hawaiian kings (1996)
 In the Ring of Fire: A Pacific Basin Journey (1997)
 Farewell to Manzanar with Connections, with Jeanne Wakatsuki Houston (1998)
 The Last Paradise (Literature of the American West) (1998)
 Snow Mountain Passage (2001)
 The Literature of California, Volume 1: Native American Beginnings to 1945, editor (2001)
 Hawaiian Son, with Eddie Kamae (2004)
 Bird of Another Heaven (2007)
 Where Light takes its Color From the Sea (2008)
 A Queen's Journey'' (2011)

Death
Houston died of complications of lymphoma, aged 75, in Santa Cruz, California.

References

External links
 .
 
 .
 .

1933 births
2009 deaths
20th-century American novelists
21st-century American novelists
Deaths from cancer in California
Deaths from lymphoma
Writers from Santa Cruz, California
Writers from the San Francisco Bay Area
San Jose State University alumni
American male novelists
American Book Award winners
20th-century American male writers
21st-century American male writers